Mateus Meira Rita (byname Nando) is a São Toméan politician. He served as the country's foreign minister from February 2002 to 8 March 2002 and again from 7 October 2002 to 8 March 2004.

References

Year of birth missing (living people)
Living people
Foreign Ministers of São Tomé and Príncipe
21st-century São Tomé and Príncipe politicians